PED, Ped-, or ped may refer to:

Abbreviations
 Parliamentary estates directorate, the body responsible for the buildings and estate of the Palace of Westminster
 Performance-enhancing drugs, substances designed to enhance the metabolism of the human body in certain medical situations
 Personal emergency device, a one-way text paging device used in the mining industry
 Pipeline embolization device, a braided stent used for the treatment of brain aneurysms
 Platform edge door, another term for a platform screen door
 Porcine epidemic diarrhoea
 Pressure Equipment Directive, a set of standards for the design and manufacture of pressure equipment in the European Union
 Price elasticity of demand, in economics
 (S)-1-phenylethanol dehydrogenase, an enzyme
 Phazon Enhancement Device, a fictional apparatus in the science fiction video game Metroid Prime 3: Corruption
 PIN entry device (see PIN pad)

Codes
 PED, IATA code for Pardubice Airport
 PED, ISO 639 code for the Mala language

Other uses
 An English prefix of Greek origin, meaning "child"
 An English prefix of Latin origin, meaning "foot"
 Ped, a unit of soil structure such as an aggregate, crumb, prism, block, or granule, formed by natural processes
 , a musical symbol indicating use of the sustain pedal on a piano or other instrument so equipped
 Programmer's EDitor, a screen-oriented text editor from Norsk Data

See also
 Pedestal (disambiguation)
 Pedestrian (disambiguation)
 Pedo (disambiguation), various meanings, most prominently as a prefix
 
 
 Pes (disambiguation)